Land of the Free is a 1988 role-playing game adventure published by R. Talsorian Games for Cyberpunk.

Plot summary
Land of the Free is an adventure in which a team of edgerunners go across the country from New York, to the deadly Night City, pursued by enemies who would kill them for a mysterious secret.

Reviews
Dragon #211
Valkyrie #1 (Sept., 1994)

References

Cyberpunk (role-playing game)
Role-playing game supplements introduced in 1988
Science fiction role-playing game adventures